Lucy Elizabeth Staniforth-Wilson (née Staniforth; born 2 October 1992) is an English professional footballer who plays as an attacking midfielder for Women's Super League club Aston Villa and the England women's national team. She has been described by former England coach Mark Sampson as "one of the best young players in Europe".

Club career

Sunderland

Staniforth began playing for the Sunderland first team at the age of 16. In her first season in senior football, she was instrumental in helping Sunderland win the FA Women's Premier League Northern Division and reach the 2009 FA Women's Cup final, where they were beaten 2–1 by Arsenal. The following season, Staniforth figured prominently as a key player in Sunderland's success as they finished fifth in their first season back at the top level.

Lincoln Ladies
Upon Sunderland's failed bid to join the FA WSL in 2010, Staniforth joined successful applicant, Lincoln Ladies. She started every game in her first season at the club, netting three times. The most notable of her goals in her first season in the Women's Super League came in the away fixture at Doncaster Belles. Staniforth helped her side reach fourth place in the league.

In the 2012 season, Staniforth bettered her goalscoring tally substantially, scoring on a further 6 occasions in all competitions. In the two ultimate games of the season, she scored winning goals for Lincoln: an extravagant lob from 35 yards against Everton Ladies, and against Chelsea Ladies, lifting the side to fifth in the table.

Bristol City
In December 2012, it was announced that Staniforth would be joining Bristol Academy, against whom she had scored twice in the preceding 2012 FA WSL season. Staniforth scored her first goal for the club in the home fixture against Doncaster Rovers Belles, with a 22-yard drive. In her first season at the Stoke Gifford Stadium, Staniforth reached the second FA Women's Cup final of her career. During the match she suffered a serious knee injury and was stretchered off. After only a short time at the club, Staniforth subsequently spent the remainder of the season sidelined, with plans to return in time for the 2014 season. Bristol ended the season runners-up, losing 2–0 on the final day of the season to champions Liverpool.

Liverpool
In February 2014, Staniforth joined reigning FA WSL champions Liverpool for a reported five-figure fee. Staniforth sustained an injury during pre-season, this time to the anterior cruciate ligament in her other leg, which put her out of action for the entirety of the 2014 season. Despite Staniforth's injury, which ruled her out for the entire season, Liverpool went on to win the FA WSL title for the second consecutive year.

Return to Sunderland
In January 2016, Staniforth left Liverpool and returned to Sunderland on a two-year contract.

At the beginning of the 2017 season, Lucy was awarded penalty-taking responsibilities for her club. In both the fifth and sixth round of the FA Women's Cup, against Aston Villa and Chelsea respectively, Staniforth scored from the penalty spot. She then scored on two further occasions in the league, from the spot against her old club Bristol City and directly from a corner against Yeovil Town with the outside of her foot.

Following Steph Bannon's departure from the club, Staniforth was named club captain of Sunderland in July 2017. Staniforth's rich vein of form continued into the 2018 season, scoring against both Sheffield and Liverpool and netting a brace against Aston Villa. In the Fourth Round of the FA Cup against Brighouse Town L.F.C, Lucy scored a second half hat-trick – the first hat-trick of her senior career. In Staniforth's inaugural season as captain, she was awarded Player of the Season for her club and nominated for Goal of the Season at the FAWSL Awards.

Birmingham City
In 2018, she joined Birmingham City. After two seasons, she left upon the expiry of her contract.

Manchester United
On 9 July 2020, Staniforth signed a two-year deal with Manchester United. She made her debut on 4 October as a 65th minute substitute in a 3–0 victory over Brighton & Hove Albion. On 1 August 2022, Staniforth signed a one-year contract extension until the end of the 2022–23 season.

Aston Villa 
On 9 January 2023, Staniforth signed for fellow WSL team Aston Villa on a free transfer following the termination of her Manchester United contract.

International career
Staniforth has represented England on the senior national team as well as numerous youth national teams.

Youth national teams, 2008–12
She featured for England in their fourth-place finish at the 2008 FIFA U-17 Women's World Cup in New Zealand, scoring an excellent goal against Japan in the quarter final.

In July 2009 Staniforth competed at the 2009 UEFA Women's Under-19 Championship in Belarus, which England won. In her time with the U-19s, she scored twice. In 2010 Staniforth helped England reach the final of the 2010 UEFA Women's Under-19 Championship in FYR Macedonia, where they lost their title to France. Later that summer Staniforth played in two of England's games at the 2010 FIFA U-20 Women's World Cup in Germany. Staniforth subsequently joined the ranks of the U-23s, making her debut against Norway in February 2012. Staniforth scored an impressive 25-yard drive in the first game of the Under-23 Four Nations La Manga Tournament, helping her team beat Sweden 2–0.

Senior national team, 2018–

Staniforth earned her first call up to the senior England squad for the 2019 FIFA Women's World Cup qualifying match against Russia at Sapsan Arena in Moscow on 8 June 2018. She gained her first cap on 4 September 2018 in a 2019 FIFA Women's World Cup qualifying match against Kazakhstan, scoring on her debut in the 66th minute. Staniforth scored the opening goal in the ultimate game of the 2019 SheBelieves Cup, helping the Lionesses beat Japan 3–0 and win the international tournament for the first time.

On 8 May 2019, Staniforth was called up to the England 23-player squad for the 2019 FIFA Women's World Cup in France.

Personal life
Staniforth comes from a footballing family, where both her father and brother were professionals. Gordon Staniforth, her father, played for York City and Hull City, his hometown club, as well as a host of other clubs. Her brother, Tom, played for Sheffield Wednesday's reserve and youth sides but died at the age of 20 in 2001. Throughout her career Lucy has worn the number 37, Tom's squad number with Sheffield Wednesday. After hitting the first goal in Lincoln's 3–0 WSL win at Doncaster Rovers Belles, Lucy revealed a T-shirt paying tribute to Tom on the tenth anniversary of his death.

Staniforth is openly lesbian and married her wife in December 2022.

Career statistics

Club
.

International goals
As of match played 6 June 2019. England score listed first, score column indicates score after each Staniforth goal.

Honours
Sunderland
FA Women's Premier League Northern Division: 2008–09
FA Cup runner-up: 2009

Bristol Academy
FA WSL runner-up: 2013
FA Cup runner-up: 2013

Liverpool
FA WSL: 2014
England
SheBelieves Cup: 2019
Individual
Sunderland Ladies Player of the Year: 2018
Sunderland Ladies Team of the Decade XI: 2010s

See also
 List of England women's international footballers
 FA WSL records and statistics

References

Further reading
 Aluko, Eniola (2019), They Don't Teach This, Random House, 
 Caudwell, Jayne (2013), Women's Football in the UK: Continuing with Gender Analyses, Taylor & Francis, 
 Dunn, Carrie (2019), Pride of the Lionesses: The Changing Face of Women's Football in England, Pitch Publishing (Brighton) Limited, 
 Dunn, Carrie (2016), The Roar of the Lionesses: Women's Football in England, Pitch Publishing Limited, 
 Grainey, Timothy (2012), Beyond Bend It Like Beckham: The Global Phenomenon of Women's Soccer, University of Nebraska Press,

External links

Profile at the Manchester United F.C. website
Profile at the Football Association website

1992 births
Living people
Footballers from York
English women's footballers
Notts County L.F.C. players
Sunderland A.F.C. Ladies players
Liverpool F.C. Women players
Bristol Academy W.F.C. players
Lesbian sportswomen
LGBT association football players
FA Women's National League players
Women's Super League players
England women's under-23 international footballers
Women's association football midfielders
England women's international footballers
Birmingham City W.F.C. players
2019 FIFA Women's World Cup players
Manchester United W.F.C. players
Aston Villa W.F.C. players